Perun is a fictional character appearing in American comic books published by Marvel Comics. The character is based on the mythical deity in Slavic mythology, with control over thunder and lightning similar to that of the Norse God Thor.

Publication history
Perun first appeared in Captain America #352-353 (April–May 1989), and was created by Mark Gruenwald and Kieron Dwyer.

Fictional character biography
In the mainstream Marvel Comics universe, Perun is the name of a fictional Russian superhero who serves in Russia's government-sponsored super-team alongside Fantasma, The Red Guardian, Vostok and Crimson Dynamo.

He wears a helmet and red cloak similar to those of Thor. He had long hair and a beard, with a great deal of body hair. Perun is an avatar of the Slavic god Perun inhabiting the body of Valeri Sovloyev.

Perun evidently first joined the Russian super-team when it was known as the Supreme Soviets. When the Soviets attacked their predecessors, the Soviet Super Soldiers, Perun is disguised as Thor due to Fantasia's magic. Nearly killing Ursa Major with his lightning.

Perun and his team, subsequently renamed the People's Protectorate, are featured in Avengers, working with the Canadian team Alpha Flight and the American team Avengers.

Perun and his team, now called the Winter Guard (a name it has retained ever since), come into conflict with the Hulk and the Pantheon over the kidnapping of Igor, a Russian spy. The Hulk believes Igor to have been responsible for his, the Hulk's, creation. Igor is put through a re-creation of the incident, which causes great distress. The Hulk easily defeats Perun and takes his weapons, using them to temporarily entrap Vostok. The confrontation ends in a stalemate, for Igor had gone mad with guilt and nobody was sure what to do.

When a group of aliens calling themselves Starblasters tries to push the moon away from Earth, Quasar assembles a group with some of the most powerful heroes of the world, recruiting Perun, Carol Danvers, Black Bolt, Hyperion, Ikaris, Darkstar, Vanguard and Monica Rambeau.

Perun and fellow Slavic god Chernobog later join the Winter Guard.

Powers and abilities
Perun can control thunder and lightning.

Equipment
Perun uses a large axe, and later a hammer and sickle, which he uses to focus and direct his electrical powers.

Other versions

Ultimate Marvel
In the Ultimate Marvel Comics universe, Perun is a member of The Liberators, described simply as a "Soviet Thor." His Ultimate universe appearance is vastly different from his mainstream appearance; he is clean-shaven and has no visible head hair. His powers are seemingly derived from a force-belt similar to that of Thor. Like his mainstream Marvel counterpart, he carries a hammer and sickle (the latter of which was dropped by Gregory Stark for loss of Soviet symbolism, but decided to keep the hammer to be Fury's own Thor).

Alongside the other members of The Liberators, Perun attacks and rapidly subdues the forces of S.H.I.E.L.D. and the weakened Ultimates. Strategic locales all across the United States are taken. The Liberators kill thousands of soldiers and citizens alike. Perun personally incapacitates Quicksilver with a lightning strike.

Perun and the Crimson Dynamo attack Air Force One capturing U.S. President George W. Bush. The plane and the passengers are brought back to the White House in Washington D.C. This is where most of Perun's teammates are killed in battle. He is seen wandering the streets, trying to find someone to surrender to.

He can also be seen in the cover of Ultimate Comics: Avengers #1. Despite their invasion failing, S.H.I.E.L.D.'s Nick Fury, and Dr. Gregory Stark decided to give Perun a second chance, instead of him being executed in his home country. Perun was spared a chance for Avengers operation, but is later killed by a vampiric Nerd Hulk (a clone of Hulk) in Ultimate Avengers 3. His hammer is later used by Captain America in a last-ditch effort to save the Triskelion and its inhabitants, using the hammer to teleport it to Iran. With all the vampires dead thanks to sunlight, Captain America then beheads the vampiric Hulk clone in retribution.

References

External links
 
 

Comics characters introduced in 1989
Fictional axefighters
Fictional characters with electric or magnetic abilities
Marvel Comics deities
Marvel Comics superheroes
Characters created by Mark Gruenwald
Fictional gods
Slavic mythology in popular culture
Fictional Slavic people
Slavic folklore characters